Ave Maria College is a Catholic secondary school for girls, established in 1963 by the Franciscan Missionaries of Mary (FMM). The college is located in Aberfeldie, a suburb of Melbourne, Australia.

This school is near to other Catholic high schools including St Columba's College and St Bernard's College.

Renovations to the school property in the last ten years include the glass-roofed Piazza with a winter garden, canteen and classrooms, refurbishment of the science and technology departments and an upgrade to the school library, now known as the Education Resource Centre (ERC). In late 2015, the school finished its renovations and had added several new classrooms and art rooms. This included a new third level building with a rooftop garden that has a view of the surrounding areas.

Houses
The four Houses are Mary, Helene, Francis, and Clare. They were previously named after great Australian women, though the names were later changed to connect more strongly with the school's religious foundations. The houses are now named in honour of the Virgin Mary, Helene de Chappotin (Founder of the FMM), St. Clare of Assisi and St. Francis of Assisi.

Curriculum
A broad core curriculum is offered to students in years 7 to 9. Year 10 students construct a program from a combination of core subjects, electives and either a Victorian Certificate of Education (VCE) subject, a Vocational Education and Training (VET) Certificate, or a Victorian Certificate of Applied Learning (VCAL). Ave Maria College offers extracurricular programs in sporting and music, as well as a specialised program to assist students who are struggling in certain subjects. The Annual Arts Festival is not to be missed. Artwork from students across all years is displayed around the school grounds and films created by Media students are also exhibited. The school's annual fashion show exhibits projects created by Year 12 Design Technology students.

School activities
Students attend a compulsory camp in years 7 and 9. Each year there is a swimming carnival and an athletics carnival, which are also compulsory to attend. Inter-school sporting activities are included as a part of the school's extracurricular program. Across the years there have been various activities including; a rock band, choir, student magazine, musical productions and sporting teams.

Associations
Ave Maria College is a member of the Alliance of Girls' Schools Australasia.

See also
Catholic All Schools Sports Association
 List of schools in Victoria, Australia
 List of high schools in Victoria
 Victorian Certificate of Education

References

External links
Ave Maria College website

Educational institutions established in 1963
Catholic secondary schools in Melbourne
Girls' schools in Victoria (Australia)
1963 establishments in Australia
Franciscan Missionaries of Mary
Buildings and structures in the City of Moonee Valley